Andreas Grunschloss (German: Grünschloß) (born 1957) is German scholar and the current Professor of Religious Studies at University of Göttingen. An ordained Protestant pastor, he is the author of books and scholarly articles about interfaith matters and new religious movements. He publishes both in German and in English and is a co-editor of the Marburg Journal of Religion.

Academic career
Grunschloss studied Protestant theology, religious science and psychology at University of Tübingen, University of Michigan (M.A. in Religious Studies, 1984) and Stanford University. (Ph.D. in Religious Studies and Missionary Science, 1992, followed by habilitation in 1998). He is also an ordained Protestant pastor. Having first taught at University of Mainz, he became Professor of Religious Studies at University of Göttingen in 2002.

Grunschloss has been a co-editor of the English-language Marburg Journal of Religion, a peer-reviewed academic Internet journal, since 1999.

In his research and publications, Grunschloss is concerned with interfaith matters. He has authored a book-length German-language study of the work of Wilfred Cantwell Smith (Religionswissenschaft als Welt-Theologie: Wilfred Cantwell Smiths interreligiöse Hermeneutik, 1994), described in the Journal of Ecumenical Studies as "the most comprehensive, balanced account and evaluation of the life and work of Wilfred Cantwell Smith". In Der eigene und der fremde Glaube: Studien zur interreligiösen Fremdwahrnehmung in Islam, Hinduismus, Buddhismus und Christentum (1999), he wrote about how members of one religion perceive those belonging to other faiths; he argues that as each religion postulates that it has privileged access to the knowledge of how things should be, it fails to see others as they really are, only ever perceiving them from a self-referential perspective as different: assuming a religious identity simultaneously creates the "other".

Grunschloss has also written about new religious movements, notably UFO religions such as Raëlism and Fiat Lux, as well as Scientology and authors such as Erich von Däniken. Grunschloss puts the appeal of UFO religions down to several factors. The thought that there should be angels or aliens overseeing human development is profoundly consoling; and members' sense that they are becoming "light workers" by joining such a movement allows them to feel enhanced self-worth, as they believe they are among the chosen few destined to prepare the New Age. Lastly, Grunschloss says, as the established religions lose their mass appeal, it is only natural that some will be attracted to "freelance" spiritual workers; he sees the most effective response to this development not in an assertion of church tradition, but in retaining the ability to engage in dialogue. Observing that UFO religions tend to combine euhemerism (by reinterpreting celestial beings simply as morally and technologically more advanced aliens) with a distinctly "religious" personal quest, Grunschloss has concluded that "UFO faith, therefore, can be understood to oscillate between disenchantment and re-enchantment."

Further reading

Books
 Religionswissenschaft als Welt-Theologie. Wilfred Cantwell Smiths interreligiöse Hermeneutik (Forschungen zur systematischen und ökumenischen Theologie, 71). Göttingen: Vandenhoeck & Ruprecht, 1994. Summary . 
 Der eigene und der fremde Glaube. Studien zur interreligiösen Fremdwahrnehmung in Islam, Hinduismus, Buddhismus und Christentum (Hermeneutische Untersuchungen zur Theologie, 37). Tübingen: Mohr/Siebeck, 1999. Summary .
 Wenn die Götter landen ... Religiöse Dimensionen des UFO-Glaubens. (EZW Texte 153) Berlin 2000. Summary .

Articles
 "Ufological Discourses in Germany". In: Partridge, Christopher. UFO Religions, Routledge 2003, 
 "Waiting for the 'Big Beam': UFO Religions and 'Ufological' Themes in New Religious Movements". In: Lewis, James R.  The Oxford Handbook of New Religious Movements, Oxford University Press, New York 2004, 
 "Ancient Astronaut" Narrations. A Popular Discourse on Our Religious Past", Marburg Journal of Religion, Volume 11, No. 1, June 2006

Notes

External links
Home page at the University of Göttingen website

German scholars
Researchers of new religious movements and cults
1957 births
Living people
University of Michigan alumni
Stanford University alumni
Academic staff of the University of Göttingen
Religious studies scholars